Italians in the World (Italiani nel Mondo, InM) was a political party in Italy, founded in September 2006 by Senator Sergio De Gregorio, a former Socialist elected in the lists of Italy of Values. The party had previously existed as a political association since 2000. The party has merged with The People of Freedom in 2009.

Defunct political parties in Italy
Political parties established in 2006